Ptychadena nilotica is a species of frog in the family Ptychadenidae. It is found in the upper reaches of the Nile and its  major tributaries in Egypt, Sudan, South Sudan, Ethiopia, Burundi, Rwanda, Uganda, Kenya, Tanzania, Democratic Republic of Congo, and possibly Djibouti, Eritrea, and Somalia. Its natural habitats are wetlands near rivers, large lakes, swamps, and freshwater marshes  and springs., as well as dry savanna, subtropical or tropical dry shrubland, arable land, irrigation canals and ditches.

References

Ptychadena
Amphibians described in 1855